Danmarks Næste Topmodel, cycle 5 was the fifth cycle of Danmarks Næste Topmodel. Caroline Fleming remained as the show's host for season five. The season began to air on September 25, 2014.

Among with the prizes was a modeling contract with Unique Model Management and the cover spread in COVER magazine Denmark.

The winner was 17-year-old Sarah Kildevæld Madsen from Horsens. The following year Kildevæld Madsen's younger brother, Daniel, won the following cycle of Danmarks Næste Topmodel.

Contestants
(ages stated are at start of contest)

Episode summaries

Episode 1
Photo of the week: Mille Mørck	
Featured photographer: Sean McMenomy
Special guests: Jesper Thomsen, Camilla Vest

Episode 2
Photo of the week: Sally Høyer	
Bottom two: Lund Larsen & Michelle Desideriussen
Quit: Michelle Desideriussen
Featured photographer: Nicky De Silva
Special guests: Gun-Britt Zeller, Henrik Bang

Episode 3
Challenge winners: Cristine Pedersen, Danielle Svendsen & Mollie Edelved	
Photo of the Week: Louie Simmersholm
Eliminated: Mirah Davidsen
Bottom two: Ceelin Aila & Danielle Svendsen

Episode 4
Challenge winner: Mini Obling
Photo of the week: Sarah Kildevæld Madsen
Eliminated: Lund Larsen
Bottom two:  Lu Toft Jørgensen & Mille Mørck 
Eliminated: Mille Mørck

Episode 5
Challenge winner: Mollie Edelved	
Photo of the week: Lu Toft Jørgensen
Bottom two: Ceelin Aila & Louie Simmersholm
Eliminated: Ceelin Aila

Episode 6
Challenge winner: Sarah Kildevæld Madsen
Photo of the week: Mini Obling
Bottom two: Cristine Pedersen & Danielle Svendsen	
Eliminated: Danielle Svendsen

Episode 7
Challenge winner: Lu Toft Jørgensen
Video of the week: Lu Toft Jørgensen
Bottom two: Cristine Pedersen & Mollie Edelved
Eliminated: Cristine Pedersen

Episode 8
Challenge winner: Lu Toft Jørgensen
Photo of the week: Louie Simmersholm
Bottom two: Sarah Kildevæld Madsen & Mollie Edelved	
Eliminated: Mollie Edelved

Episode 9
Challenge winner: Louie Simmersholm	
First eliminated: Mini Obling
Photo of the week: Sally Høyer
Second eliminated: Louie Simmersholm

Episode 10
Final three: Lu Toft Jørgensen, Sally Høyer & MiniObling
Danmarks Næste Topmodel: Sarah Kildevæld Madsen

Summaries

Results table

 The contestant won photo of the week
 The contestant was in danger of elimination
 The contestant was eliminated
 The contestant won the competition

Photo shoot guide
Episode 1 photo shoot: Promotional pictures in school girl outfits (casting)
Episode 2 photo shoot: Urban picnic for Renault Twingo
Episode 3 photo shoot: Burlesque in a giant martini glass
Episode 4 photo shoot: 60's movement in B&W
Episode 5 photo shoot: Medieval editorial
Episode 6 photo shoot: Vampire couples
Episode 7 music video: "Ready for me now" - Joey Moe
Episode 8 photo shoot: English upper class
Episode 9 photo shoot: Four seasons beauty shots
Episode 10 photo shoot: Covers for COVER magazine

Post–Topmodel careers

Michelle Desideriussen signed with Talent Model Management, Basic Pro Models, Diva Dubai Model Agency in Dubai, JNG Management in Hamburg and Nidal's Model Agency in Beirut. She has taken a couple of test shots and appeared on the cover and editorials for Femme Lebanon magazine, Spécial Lebanon magazine, Laha magazine, Plastik magazine, PUMP magazine,... She is also been modeled for Blanka Luz Fashion, Kevork Makassian SS 2016, Mimia Leblanc Jewelry, Label Queen, Bags by Phoxx, Sadek Majed Couture, Rony Abou Hamdan Couture, Coronet By Reena Ahluwalia, Maison Lesley lookbook, TP-Kjoler, Jbara Jewelry,... She is also compete on several beauty-pageant competitions like Miss Eco Universe 2016 representing Denmark and Miss Denmark 2022 representing Bornholm.
Lund Larsen has taken a couple of test shots and modeled for SHINE By Marjun. She retired from modeling in 2020.
Mille Morck has taken a couple of test shots and walked in the fashion shows during Miss World Denmark 2014 Charity Show. She is also represent Hellerup in the Miss World Denmark 2014. She retired from modeling in 2018.
Danielle Svendsen has modeled for Kilsgaard Acetates and walked in the fashion shows for several designers during Rosengårdcentrets Fall Fashion Show 2018. She retired from modeling in 2019.
Cristine Pedersen signed with Unique Models. She has taken a couple of test shots and walked in the fashion show for Designers' Nest during Copenhagen Fashion Week 2016. She retired from modeling in 2019.
Mollie Edelved did not pursue modeling after the show but was voted as the "Crush of the month" of December 2020 by M! magazine.
Mini Obling signed with Le Management and Smash Agency. She has taken a couple of test shots and appeared on the cover and editorials for Bryllup magazine, The Western Star,... She is also been modeled for Gadegaard Design, Solveig Lundbæk Brudekjoler, Ani Iskandaryan, ONEofONE by Maibritt Kokholm,... and walked in the fashion shows for Hunkemöller, for a designer during the Zonta Ladies Race Day fashion parade,... Beside modeling, Obling is also pursuing an acting career.
Louie Simmersholm signed with Unique Models. She has taken a couple of test shots and appeared on an editorials for Cover magazine. She is also been modeled for Rene Gurskov lookbook, Natasha Golshani,... and walked in the fashion shows of Henrik Vibskov, Rene Gurskov A/W 20/21,... Beside modeling, Simmersholm is also pursuing career as a fashion designer.
Lu Toft Jørgensen has taken a couple of test shots and modeled for ONEofONE by Maibritt Kokholm. She retired from modeling in 2016.
Sarah Kildevæld Madsen has collected her prizes and signed with Unique Models. She is also signed with Born Models, WOW Casting agency, Gossip Model Management, Modellink Agency in Gothenburg, Mad Models Management in Barcelona and Ps Model Management in Munich. She has taken a couple of test shots and appeared on an editorials for Cover magazine, Couch magazin, Creators magazine, Hotel magazine, Nirvana magazine #26,... She is also been shooting print works for La Maison Justian Kunz A/W 2015/16, Emporia, Rigmor Copenhagen, Why7 Jeans, Livkragh, Kasperastrup, Bogner Fashion, Kurhotel Skodsborg,... Kildevæld has walked in the fashion shows for Designers Remix, Kopenhagen Fur, Sand Copenhagen, Maikel Tawadros, Stasia Couture, Fonnesbech, Designers Nest, Michael Costello Spring/Summer 2017, La Maison Justian Kunz, Escada, Rodenstock GmbH,...

References

Danmarks Næste Topmodel
2014 Danish television seasons